Mohamed First University, Oujda, Morocco, was founded in 1978. The university has more than 21,200 students (2007) on the sites of Oujda and Nador (and Al Hoceima since 2008). It has 590 professors and 440 personal and technical staff.

Organization 
It is composed of six faculties and four schools, and trains its students in the domains of science, law, literature, linguistics, history, geography, management, economy, technology, and engineering and medical sciences. The university consists of the following institutions:
 Faculty of Letters and Human Sciences, Oujda, 1978
 Faculty of Juridical, Economic and Social Sciences, Oujda, 1978
 Faculty of Sciences, Oujda, 1979
 Polydiscipline Faculty, Nador, 2005
 Higher School of Technology, Oujda
 National School of Applied Sciences, Oujda
 National School of Applied Sciences, Al Hoceima, 2008
 National School of Commerce and Management, Oujda
 Faculty of Medicine and Pharmacy, Oujda
 Faculty of Technical Sciences, Al Hoceima

References

External links

1978 establishments in Morocco
Educational institutions established in 1978
Universities in Morocco
20th-century architecture in Morocco